The 2025 FISU Summer World University Games (Universiade), the XXXII Summer World University Games and commonly known as the Rhine-Ruhr 2025 FISU Summer World University Games, the 32nd edition of the event, is scheduled to be held from 16 to 27 July 2025 in the Rhine-Ruhr region of Germany.

Host selection

Sports 
Rhine-Ruhr has already proposed beach volleyball, rowing and 3x3 basketball as its  optional sports. A total of 18 sports will be contested (15 core sports and 3 optional sports).

 Aquatics
 
 
 
 
 
 
 Basketball
  

 
{

 
 
 
 
 
Volleyball

References

External links 
 Official website

2025
Universiade Summer
Summer Universiade
International sports competitions hosted by Germany
Sport in North Rhine-Westphalia
Multi-sport events in Germany